Kronosaurus (meaning "lizard of Kronos") is an extinct and potentially dubious genus of short-necked pliosaurs that lived during the Early Cretaceous period (Aptian to Late Albian) in what is now Australia. One species is known, K. queenslandicus, described in 1924 from a partial fossil discovered in Queensland (hence its name). The rare other fossils traditionally attributed to the genus indicate that the animal should have reached a size approaching  in length.

The relevance of this taxon is problematic due to the fragmentary nature of the holotype, which is a partial mandibular symphysis. Several specimens, including more or less complete skeletons, have been assigned to the genus and have been proposed as neotypes, but without any confirmation from ICZN. Additionally, some of these specimens have been moved to different genera, making the validity of Kronosaurus even more uncertain.

The fossil record shows that Kronosaurus lived in an inland sea that reached rather cold temperatures.

Research history

Discovery and naming 
The first known specimen of Kronosaurus was discovered in 1899 in the town of Hughenden, Queensland, Australia, by Andrew Crombie, and consists of a partial mandibular symphysis bearing six conical teeth. After this discovery, Crombie donated the fossil to the Queensland Museum and was cataloged under the code name QM F1609. 25 years later, in 1924, Albert Heber Longman published a paper that identified the specimen as the holotype of a new genus and species of a pliosaur, which he named Kronosaurus queenslandicus. The etymology of the binomial name comes from the Ancient Greek Κρόνος (Krónos, "Kronos"), a Titan from the Greek mythology, and σαῦρος (saûros, "lizard"), to literally give "lizard of Kronos", in reference to the imposing size and the possible ferocity of the animal. The specific epithet queenslandicus is named after the Queensland, the Australian territory from which the holotype specimen was discovered. Additional material from Kronosaurus, including a partial skull, was discovered in 1929, in the same location as the original discovery made by Crombie.

Harvard's completed skeleton

In 1931 the Harvard Museum of Comparative Zoology (MCZ) sent an expedition to Australia for the dual purpose of procuring specimens – the museum being "weak in Australian animals and...desires[ing] to complete its series" – and to engage in "the study of the animals of the region when alive." The Harvard Australian Expedition (1931–1932), as it became known, was a six-man venture led by Harvard Professor William Morton Wheeler, with the others being Dr. P. Jackson Darlington Jr. (a renowned coleopterist), Dr. Glover Morrill Allen and his student Ralph Nicholson Ellis, medical officer Dr. Ira M. Dixon, and William E. Schevill (a graduate-student in his twenties and Associate Curator of Invertebrate Palaeontology). MCZ director Thomas Barbour said at the time "We shall hope for specimens' of the kangaroo, the wombat, the Tasmanian devil and Tasmanian wolf," and the mission was a success with over 300 mammal and thousands of insect specimens returning to the United States. Yet Mr. Schevill, the team's fossil enthusiast, remained in Australia after the others had departed and, in the winter of 1932, was told by the rancher R.W.H. Thomas of rocks with something "odd" poking out of them on his property near Hughenden. The rocks were limestone nodules containing the most complete skeleton of Kronosaurus ever discovered. After dynamiting the nodules out of the ground (and into smaller pieces weighing approximately four tons) with the aid of a British migrant trained in the use of explosives, William Schevill had the fossils shipped back to Harvard for examination and preparation. The skull—which matched the holotype jaw fragment of K. queenslandicus—was prepared right away, but time and budget constraints put off restoration of the nearly complete skeleton – most of the bones of which remained unexcavated within the limestone blocks – for 20 years.

This interim ended when they came to the attention of Godfrey Lowell Cabot – Boston industrialist, philanthropist, and founder of the Cabot Corporation – "who was then in his nineties" and "had been interested in sea serpents since childhood." Having formerly questioned MCZ director Alfred Romer about the existence and reports of sea serpents, it thus occurred to Dr. Romer to tell Mr. Cabot about the skeleton in the museum closet. Godfrey Cabot thus asked how much a restoration would cost and "Romer, pulling a figure out of the musty air, replied, 'Oh, about $10,000.'" Romer may not have been serious but the philanthropist clearly was because the check for said sum came shortly thereafter. Two years – and more than $10,000 – later, following the careful labor of the museum preparators, the restored and mounted skeleton was displayed at Harvard in 1959. However, Dr. Romer and MCZ preparator Arnold Lewis confirmed that same year in the institution's journal Breviora that "erosion had destroyed a fair fraction of this once complete and articulated skeleton...so that approximately a third of the specimen as exhibited is plaster restoration." Furthermore, the original (real) bones are also layered in plaster; a fact that, while keeping the fossils safe, makes it difficult for paleontologists to study it – an issue which factors into the controversial question of the true size of the Kronosaurus queenslandicus.

In 2021, a revision of "K". boyacensis also transferred most of the remains of K. queenslandicus, including the Harvard remains, to a new genus and species, Eiectus longmani. The revision limits the genus Kronosaurus to the holotype mandible, and treats it as a nomen dubium.

However, more recent studies, comparing fossil specimens of Kronosaurus to other pliosaurs suggests that the Harvard reconstruction may have included too many vertebrae, exaggerating the previous estimate, with the true length probably only .

Description 

Like other pliosaurs, Kronosaurus was a marine reptile. It had an elongated head, a short neck, a stiff body propelled by four flippers, and a relatively short tail. The posterior flippers were larger than the anterior. Kronosaurus was carnivorous, and had many long, sharp, conical teeth. A feature of the genus Kronosaurus is that the first three maxillary teeth are enlarged to fangs. The skull length of Kronosaurus was estimated to be .

All Sauropterygians had a modified pectoral girdle that supported a powerful swimming stroke. Kronosaurus and other plesiosaurs/pliosaurs had a similarly adapted pelvic girdle, allowing them to push hard against the water with all four flippers. Between its two limb girdles was a massive mesh of gastralia (belly ribs) that provided additional strength and support. The strength of the limb girdles, combined with evidence of large, powerful swimming muscles, indicates that Kronosaurus was likely a fast, active swimmer.

Kronosaurus queenslandicus has four pairs of premaxillary teeth. The first three pairs of its maxillary teeth are large caniniform teeth, and in its lower jaw there are also three pairs of large caniniform teeth which are located immediately in front of the three maxillary caniniforms when the mouth is closed. Two pairs of the lower jaw caniniforms occlude between the last pair of premaxillary teeth and first pair of maxillary teeth in a diastema (gap in the tooth row). The enlargement of these two pairs of lower jaw teeth in K. queenslandicus may be related to the absence of a fifth pair of premaxillary teeth, which are present in a number of other pliosaurs.

However, they lack carinae (cutting edges) and the distinct trihedral (three facets) of Pliosaurus and Liopleurodon teeth. The combination of large size, conical shape and lack of cutting edges allows for easy identification of Kronosaurus teeth in Cretaceous formations from Australia.

Classification

Taxonomic validity

The validity of Kronosaurus was a longstanding issue due to the fragmentary nature of the holotype. Welles (1962) declared the taxon as a nomen vanum and recommended the designation of a neotype specimen that would preserve the taxon's validity. McHenry (2009) subsequently proposed that two partial skeletons (QM F18827 and QM F10113) that matched the holotype's features and were from its same geological horizon (Toolebuc Formation) could be candidate neotypes. However, no formal petition to the ICZN to designate a neotype was ever submitted. In 2021, Noè and Gómez-Pérez formally restricted Kronosaurus to the holotype. They subsequently erected a new taxon named Eiectus longmani with the Harvard skeleton (MCZ 1285) as its holotype and reassigned all specimens previously referred as K. queenslandicus to it. This move, which was initially interpreted as renaming the entire species to E. longmani, faced criticism by paleontologists. Darren Naish commented that the apparent renaming was "not a good idea" that discourages stability while paleontologist Daniel Madzia dubbed the situation "Kronogate" and criticized the decision to not petition for a neotype. However, the reassignment of all Kronosaurus material to the new taxon is tentative. Noè & Gómez-Pérez (2021) noted the likelihood that the fossils actually represent multiple pliosaur species, meaning that the Toolebuc Formation specimens could be distinct from E. longmani, and previous studies already suggested that the Harvard skeleton might be distinct from K. queenslandicus.

Phylogeny  
Traditionally, Kronosaurus is classified as a member of the subfamily Brachaucheninae, which consists of pliosaurs that are currently only known during the Cretaceous period. Phylogenetic analyzes consider it close to certain genera such as Brachauchenius or Megacephalosaurus, particularly on the basis of dental comparisons.

The cladogram below is modified from Madzia et al. (2018).

Palaeobiology 
 
Fossil stomach contents from Northern Queensland show that Kronosaurus preyed on turtles and plesiosaurs. Fossil remains of large octobrachians have been found in the same area as Kronosaurus. While no direct evidence of the animal predating on these octobrachians exists they fall within the projected size range of prey Kronosaurus would potentially have pursued.

Large, round bite-marks have been found on the skull of an Albian-age Australian elasmosaurid (Eromangasaurus) that could be from a Kronosaurus attack.

Paleoecology 
Kronosaurus is known from remains in Australia. The area was covered by a shallow inland sea called the Eromanga Sea which Kronosaurus inhabited. This environment was notably cold, experiencing near freezing temperatures and seasonal ice in certain regions.

See also 

 List of plesiosaur genera
 Timeline of plesiosaur research
 Platypterygius

References

External links 
 Genus Kronosaurus. The Plesiosaur Directory.

Pliosaurids
Early Cretaceous plesiosaurs
Aptian life
Albian life
Early Cretaceous reptiles of Australia
Fossils of Australia
Early Cretaceous reptiles of South America
Cretaceous Colombia
Fossils of Colombia
Paja Formation
Altiplano Cundiboyacense
Fossil taxa described in 1924
Fossil taxa described in 1992
Taxa named by Albert Heber Longman
Sauropterygian genera